William M. Shernoff (born c.1949) is a prominent American trial lawyer based in Claremont, California/Beverly Hills, USA. He is one of the pioneers of a branch of law known as "insurance bad faith", in which he investigates the alleged bad faith and misconduct of insurance companies. This began in 1971 with his first insurance case. He then founded the firm of Shernoff Bidart Echeverria LLP, in 2004, heading a team of 10 litigation lawyers who are widely known as the "bad faith insurance lawyers". Shernoff is also the author and co-author of several books on law, including Bad Faith (1984), Payment Refused (1986), How to Make Insurance Companies Pay Your Claims and What to Do If They Don't (1990) and Fight Back & Win (1999). He has served for many years on the board of directors of the national insurance consumer organization, United Policyholders.

Early life
William M. Shernoff was born circa 1949 in Wisconsin. His father was a lawyer.

Career
In 1974, Shernoff won a $5 Million punitive damages verdict for a roofer whose disability payments had been cut off (Egan v. Mutual of Omaha). In 1979, he persuaded the California Supreme Court to establish new case law, based on Egan, that permits plaintiffs to sue insurance companies for bad faith seeking both compensatory and punitive damages when companies unreasonably handle a policyholder's claim.

In 1979, Shernoff won a landmark case amounting to $86 million for the MGM Grand Hotel in Las Vegas when the insurance company failed to meet its obligations after the fire which devastated the hotel.

His most successful case was in the early 1990s related to Cyclone Val, a tropical cyclone that devastated American Samoa in December 1991. In 1991, American Samoa had purchased a $45-million "all risk" insurance policy from the firm Affiliated FM Insurance. However, the firm would only pay up $6.1 million for the damages, arguing that the insurance did not cover water damage, only that driven by the wind. Shernoff investigated and discovered that the insurance company had altered American Samoa's insurance policy to exclude damages caused by "wind-driven water", despite it still covering hurricanes. The case was taken to court and in 1995 the jury awarded the American Samoa Government $28.9 million, and then added twice that amount ($57.8 million) for punitive damages. The total award in the final judgment was $86.7  million, which is stated to be the largest insurance bad faith judgment in the state of California, in 1995.

Shernoff also won several landmark cases against Generali insurance on behalf of Holocaust victims, which paved the way for a historic five billion dollar settlement for Holocaust victim restitution in 2002.

Shernoff is highly acclaimed in the legal profession in the United States and has ranked on The Best Lawyers in America, every year since its first edition in 1983. In 2004, he was named "Super Lawyer" by Law & Politics and Los Angeles magazine and was named as one of the 100 Most Influential Attorneys in California.

Personal life
Shernoff married Jilda Shernoff in Beverly Hills, California. They have one daughter, Summer.

References

External links
Shernoff Bidart Echeverria LLP
William's Staff Profile

Living people
1940s births
People from Wisconsin
People from Beverly Hills, California
California lawyers